Euphaedra stellata is a butterfly in the family Nymphalidae. It is found in Cameroon. The habitat consists of forests.

References

Butterflies described in 1991
stellata
Endemic fauna of Cameroon
Butterflies of Africa